Arenivirga flava is a Gram-positive, rod-shaped, non-endospore-forming and non-motile species of bacteria from the family of Microbacteriaceae.

References

Microbacteriaceae
Bacteria described in 2017
Monotypic bacteria genera